Filipe José Lima Mendes (born 17 June 1985) is a Portuguese former professional footballer who played as a goalkeeper.

References

External links

1985 births
Living people
Portuguese footballers
Footballers from Lisbon
Association football goalkeepers
Primeira Liga players
Liga Portugal 2 players
Segunda Divisão players
C.F. Estrela da Amadora players
G.D. Tourizense players
F.C. Paços de Ferreira players
C.D. Santa Clara players
A.D. Lousada players
C.F. Os Belenenses players
Real S.C. players
Belenenses SAD players
Casa Pia A.C. players
Portugal youth international footballers